European-American Business Organization, Inc. (EABO) is a New York NY consulting firm specializing in transatlantic business development and international tax services. It offers a variety of services such as early stage venture funding, market expansion strategy, international trade show planning, public relations strategies, and legal assistance. Founder and CEO is former Managing Director of the European American Chamber of Commerce in the United States (until 1998)  Sven C. Oehme.

The European Commission appointed EABO's affiliate American Business Forum on Europe (ABFE) as the first Euro Info Correspondence Center (EICC) in the U.S. in 2005. EABO is part of Enterprise Europe Network (ENN, successor to EICC), a member of the Transatlantic Business Dialogue, and a partner in the US-EU-Match consortium. The US-EU Match consortium was formed in 2008 by NineSigma, Intrasoft International, RTI International, and EABO. The consortium - EEN's exclusive U.S. member - is focused on connecting U.S. organizations to potential European partners in 40 countries.

CEO Sven Oehme is a proponent of the Transatlantic Trade and Investment Partnership TTIP and a frequent speaker in the ongoing negotiations.

See also
Euro-American relations
Transatlantic Free Trade Area (TFTA)

References

External links
EABO :: the European-American Business Organization, inc.
EABO :: the European-American Business Organization, inc. eabo-associated international tax consulting firm

Consulting firms of the United States